Kanatal is a small village and a hill station in the state of Uttarakhand, India. Kanatal is 78 km from Dehradun (capital of the State Uttarakhand), 38 km from Mussoorie and 12 km from Chamba. It is on the Chamba-Mussoorie road and nearly 300 km from Delhi.

History
Kanatal's history dates back to some decades when a small lake also known as “taal” or pond had dried up. When it dried up, people began to refer to it as kaana taal. The name of the nearby area is Kanatal. In Hindi, the word kaana usually refers to a dry well or pond.

Surkanda Devi is a temple in Kaddukhal, dedicated to Sati. Surkanda is where the head of Sati had fallen after Shiva carried her on his trishool after she set herself on fire. The temple is known for its architectural beauty and its location – perched at an altitude 2,700 meters that offers a 360 degree view of the surrounding region along with the Himalayan mountains. This temple is 8 km on the road to Mussoorie to Kaddukhal.

Climate
During the summer, temperatures range from 10 to 20 degrees Celsius, and during the winter, temperatures range from -5 to 10 degrees Celsius. During the winter, heavy snowfall blocks roads in the area. Kanatal is subject to high winds due to its high altitude.

Geography
Surkanda Devi Temple is the highest point.

Accessibility
Kanatal is connected by road to Delhi and other major cities. Accessible from Rishikesh or Dehradun. Both are connected by railways from Delhi. The nearest airport is in Dehradun.

Places of interest
 Tehri Dam at New Tehri is dam is built on the confluence of River Bhagirathi and Bhilangna.
 Kodia Jungle is 1 km away on the road towards Chamba. 
 Mussoorie is 40 km from Kanatal and is a popular tourist destination.
 Chamba is 15 km from Kanatal.
 Dhanaulti is 15 km from Kanatal. 
 Shivpuri is about 75 km from Kanatal and close to Rishikesh is Shivpuri, a rafting location.
 SunSet Point Sun Set is Best Visible from Himalyan Aleph Bunglow amongst the daisies in the summer in their Orchard all year around or bhandri farm eco park.
 Resting goddess hill view point (Best view in moon light)
Bliss of Nature Kanatal also offers adventure and activities. Camp Chayan Kanatal provides camping experience.

References

Cities and towns in Tehri Garhwal district
Tourism in Uttarakhand